Andrew Black (born 20 July 1965) is a poker player from Belfast, Northern Ireland, who presently resides in Dublin.

Early Life

Black played cards with his mother when he was younger. He began playing more seriously in 1986, whilst he was studying for a law degree at Trinity College, Dublin. He also began playing in the Griffin Casino in Dublin, reportedly because of the free food and coffee.

Career

He was knocked out of the 1997 World Series of Poker (WSOP) main event by the eventual winner, Stu Ungar. The following year a documentary titled Million Dollar Deal (narrated by John Hurt) was made of his visit to the same tournament. When he lost that too, he discarded all his possessions, travelled to England and lived in a semi-monastic Buddhist environment for 5 years.

Black successfully returned to poker in 2004, dominating in Irish tournaments and placing fifth in the 2005 World Series of Poker main event.  He led the final table of the main event at one stage holding over 1/3 of the chips in play, however, he was unable to maintain this lead and finished 5th, winning $1.75m.

In 2005 he appeared on the chatshow Heads Up with Richard Herring to discuss his faith and his poker career. Since the 2005 World Series of Poker main event, he has made a money finish on both the European Poker Tour and the World Poker Tour. In 2006 Black made the final table of the Tournament of Champions where he once again held a huge chip lead only to cripple his stack when he overplayed AK and ran into Daniel Negreanu holding pocket Kings. Black once again was eliminated in 5th place earning $100,000.

Black enjoyed a spectacular start to 2007 placing 2nd for $100,000 in the Pot Limit Omaha event and 3rd in the No Limit Main Event for $700,000 at the Aussie Millions in Melbourne, Australia. At the EPT Grand Final in Monte Carlo, Black once again enjoyed a deep run in a major event reaching the final table before exiting in 7th for $320,000. In 2007, Black won the Pot Limit Omaha side event at the Irish Open. He got €54,589 for the win. He defeated Michael Greco heads-up.

At the 2007 World Series of Poker, Black finished in the money in two Pot Limit Omaha events, finishing 7th and 11th respectively. At the 2007 World Series of Poker Main Event, Black played day 1A. He was one of the early chip leaders, building his stack from 20,000 to over 80,000. Despite this, Black did not make it past day 1. He was eliminated when his 45 ran into AA on a 433 flop.

In 2008, Black beat Roland De Wolfe heads-ups to win Premier League Poker II and $250,000. His 2008 continued with a 16th place in the WPT World Poker Classic for $105,525 and three further cash finishes in the WSOP.

He has had deep runs in the Irish Poker Open in 2010–2013, finishing just outside the final table in 10th place in 2011 and in 8th place in 2012. In 2010 he was the subject of RTÉ Radio One's Shuffle Up And Deal. Black joined 616 players at Dublin's Bonnington Hotel for the €230/$248 Amateur Championship of Poker (ACOP) in February 2019, placing first. As of September 2020, his total live tournament winnings exceed $4,885,354. His 36 cashes as the WSOP account for $2,527,162 of those winnings.

Notes

External links
RTÉ Radio One's Shuffle Up And Deal
PokerListings. Andy Black looks back on almost 20 years of WSOP main event action 
Andy Black Scores Another Home Win at 2019 Dublin Amateur Poker Festival
Who are the all-time leaders in Poker in Europe? Part 2. Northern Europe

1965 births
Living people
Buddhists from Northern Ireland
Irish poker players
Poker commentators
Poker players from Northern Ireland
Sportspeople from Belfast